The California Teachers Association (CTA), initially established in 1863, is one of the largest and most powerful teachers' unions in the state with over 300,000 members and a high political profile in California politics. The teachers' union is based in Burlingame, and its current president is E. Toby Boyd.

History

CTA was founded in 1863, during the Civil War, in response to a call from the California Superintendent of Public Instruction, John Swett, for a "teachers' institute."  Fewer than a hundred teachers, all of them male, gathered in San Francisco, resulting in the formation of the California Educational Society.  In 1875, the organization changed its name to the California Teachers Association.

CTA won its first major legislative victory in 1866 with a law providing free public schools to California children. A year later, public funding was secured for schools that educated nonwhite students. More early victories for organized labor established bans on using public school funding for sectarian religious purposes (1878–79); free textbooks for all students in grades 1-8 (1911); the first teacher tenure and due process law (1912); and a statewide pension, the California State Teachers’ Retirement System (1913).

While the National Labor Relations Act of 1935 made collective bargaining a lawful, protected activity in the private sector, it did not include public workers or teachers. Wisconsin passed the nation's first public employee bargaining law (1959), and several large, urban affiliates of NEA or the American Federation of Teachers started winning bargaining rights (New York in 1961, Denver in 1962, Chicago in 1966). After a decade of school strikes and teacher organizing, California K-14 educators won the right to bargain collectively in 1975 when the CTA-sponsored Educational Employment Relations Act, also known as the Rodda Act, was signed into law by Gov. Jerry Brown.

A turning point in CTA's history came in 1988. That was the year teachers fought to pass Proposition 98, the landmark state law guaranteeing about 40 percent of the state's general fund for schools and community colleges.

References

External links
 CTA.org - California Teachers Association homepage
  - California Educator Magazine
  - Secretary of State Campaign Disclosure

1863 establishments in California
Trade unions in California
Education in California
National Education Association
Burlingame, California
Education trade unions
State wide trade unions in the United States
Trade unions established in 1863